MV Hebrides is a ferry owned by Caledonian Maritime Assets Limited and operated by Caledonian MacBrayne from Uig to Lochmaddy and Tarbert, the main settlements of North Uist and Harris respectively.

History
The present MV Hebrides revived a traditional name on the "Uig Triangle" and is the third vessel in the CalMac fleet to have borne that name over the years. She carries the bell of the first  (an 1898 steamer) which also graced the second "Heb" (1964). The 1964 ship was MacBrayne's first car ferry and very much a favourite, which for twenty years also sailed from Uig, Skye.

Following sea trials on the Clyde in early 2001, Hebrides made her way round to Uig, Tarbert and Lochmaddy, conducting berthing trials at the three linkspans. Uig and Tarbert piers had to be extended to accommodate the new, larger vessel. On entry into service on 24 March 2001 she displaced  to Islay.

There were no Sunday sailings to or from Tarbert, so Hebrides concentrated on serving Lochmaddy on North Uist. The ratio of crossings is approximately 2:1 in favour of North Uist. Having  at Stornoway (serving Lewis and Harris), and in 2003 the introduction of the new  (making inter-island access easier) have encouraged this trend.

Hebrides is due to be replaced on the Uig Triangle by a new ferry, one of two dual-fuel vessels being built at Ferguson Marine shipyard in Port Glasgow on the Clyde. After much delay, the new ferry, known as Hull 802, is expected to be named by public vote, with delivery due in early 2023.

Layout
There is an increased amount of open deck space, the majority of it being covered. She was the first vessel of the fleet to be equipped with a Marine Evacuation System of inflatable chutes leading to large liferafts in place of conventional lifeboats. Following simulations and the success of the Clansman’s design, her hull incorporates fewer gaps for water to escape from the car deck.

The Hebrides loads vehicles via a stern ramp at Uig and through the bow at the two Outer Isles ports. Like the Clansman, there is an open stern, allowing her to carry hazardous goods whilst still carrying foot passengers. The car deck has room for approximately 80 cars. A mezzanine deck on the starboard side can be raised or lowered to allow loading of eighteen more cars.

The entrance lobby has the shop and information desk. Forward are a lounge and Mariners Cafeteria at the bow. Aft is the Chieftain Bar and open deck area. On the deck above are an observation lounge at the bow, crew accommodation and further open deck.

Service
MV Hebrides is normally found sailing from Uig on Skye to Tarbert and Lochmaddy, and rarely sailed anywhere else in her early service life. One notable exception was during closure of the Uig linkspan, when she sailed from Ullapool for a week or so. Similarly, when the linkspan at Lochmaddy was closed for repairs, Hebrides used the facilities at Lochboisdale in South Uist. During the spring of 2007 the ship was converted to burn oil, and was trialled on the Oban to Coll, Tiree and Barra and South Uist services. Her sister, Clansman, soon returned, and Hebrides spent another five years never deviating from her route except for her annual overhaul, which was usually done either at Greenock, Aberdeen, Leith or Birkenhead.

In August 2012, CalMac announced that Hebrides was to be the main relief vessel for the next winter, a role which had usually been assigned to her sister . The Islay ferry  was chosen as Hebrides''' replacement at Uig, Lochmaddy and Tarbert from 1 December. In December 2012, Hebrides relieved  on the Oban to Craignure and Colonsay services, as well as running extra services to Coll, Tiree, Barra and South Uist over the festive season. In January 2013, Hebrides relieved  on the Ardrossan to Brodick service, and in February relieved  on the Ullapool to Stornoway service. Hebrides then relieved  on the Outer Isles services in March, before finally returning to the Uig, Lochmaddy & Tarbert triangle after her own overhaul, before the summer timetable started in March 2013. In October 2013, she made an unexpected return to Stornoway to relieve the broken-down , which went into drydock for propeller shaft problems. In September 2018, Hebrides operated to Stornoway whilst the pier at Tarbert was occupied by the damaged Norwegian freighter Fame.

Incident in 2016Hebrides collided with pontoons and then ran aground at Lochmaddy on 25 September 2016, after apparently suffering engine difficulties. It was reported that the vessel became stuck in forward gear and remained in gear after running aground. The vessel later managed to dock and disembark the passengers and vehicles aboard. Calmac reported that the hull was intact and that divers were en route to inspect the damage. Following inspection, Hebrides was moved to Greenock for drydocking and repairs. Meanwhile Clansman was transferred to Uig to take over the route, with Isle of Lewis providing an additional sailing from Lochmaddy to Uig to clear the backlog of traffic.  Hebrides'' returned to service on 17 October 2016.

See also
 Caledonian MacBrayne fleet

References

External links

 MV Hebrides on www.calmac.co.uk

Caledonian MacBrayne
2000 ships
Ships built on the River Clyde
Maritime incidents in 2016